St Mary's Church, Clapham, officially Our Immaculate Lady of Victories, is a Grade II*-listed Roman Catholic church on Clapham Park Road in Clapham, South London, England run by the London province of the Redemptorist Congregation within the Archdiocese of Southwark. The church is located on the corner of Clapham Common, near Clapham Common tube station.

The current Bishop of Hallam, Ralph Heskett, was parish priest at St Mary's between 1999 and 2008. The current parish priest of St Mary's is Fr Richard Reid CSsR.

Church building
Founded by Bishop (later Cardinal) Nicholas Wiseman, the foundation stone of the current church of St Mary's was laid in 1849. Designed in a Gothic Revival style by William Wardell, the building was completed during 1851 and blessed by Cardinal Wiseman on 14 May 1851. On 8 February 1979 the church was listed on the National Heritage List for England.

See also

 St Mary's Roman Catholic Primary School

References

External links

Official website of St. Mary's Roman Catholic Church, Clapham
Official website of St. Mary's Roman Catholic Primary School, Clapham

Mary
Churches in the Diocese of Southwark
Clapham
Redemptorist churches in the United Kingdom
Roman Catholic churches completed in 1851
Clapham
Clapham